is the oldest stone inscription in Japan and the earliest example of Japanese calligraphy. This stone commemorated the construction of Uji Bridge, which was completed in 646. The inscription states that the bridge was built by a monk named Dōtō (道登). However, this is contradicted by the 8th-century Shoku Nihongi, which states that the bridge was built by another monk named Dōshō (道昭).

References

External links
橋寺-近畿のお宝マップ「トレジャーナビ・京都」-近畿農政局整備部 Hashi-dera—Kinki no Otakara Map "Treasure-navi Kyoto"—Kinki Agriculture Department Upkeep Section, Ministry of Agriculture, Forestry and Fisheries (Japan) (Retrieved on May 15, 2009)
Photograph in archives of Kyoto Prefecture (Retrieved on May 15, 2009)
宇治探訪　-お薦め観光スポット- Uji Tanbō —Osusume Kankō Spot— Uji City web site (Retrieved on May 15, 2009)
宇治市・宇治橋断碑 Uji-shi Ujibashi Danpi, KIIS (Kansai Institute of Information Systems & Industrial Renovation (Retrieved on May 15, 2009)
橋寺放生院（宇治橋の守り寺） Hashi-dera Hōjō-in (temple where the stone is located) (Retrieved on May 15, 2009)

Important Cultural Properties of Japan
Japanese inscriptions
Japanese literature in Classical Chinese